Archbishop Anastasi of Tirana, Durrës and All Albania (secular name: Anastasios Yannoulatos; born 4 November 1929) is the Archbishop of Tirana, Durrës and All Albania and as such the primate and Head of the Holy Synod of the Autocephalous Orthodox Church of Albania. He was elected in June 1992. Professor Emeritus of the National University of Athens. Honorary Member of the Academy of Athens. Anastasi is one of the presidents of the Central Committee of the World Council of Churches. He is also the honorary president of the World Conference of Religions for Peace.

Life and career
Yannoulatos was born in Piraeus, Greece. On 24 December 2017 he became an Albanian citizen. He is the head of the Orthodox Autocephalous Church of Albania. His work included charity in Africa in his early years prior to becoming the Archbishop of Albania.

Education
Yannoulatos obtained a Certificate of High School with High Honours in 1947, a Bachelor of Divinity from the National University of Athens with High Honors (1952), and carried out post-graduate studies in the History of Religions, Ethnology, Missions, and Africanology at the Universities of Hamburg and Marburg. He undertook research at Makerere University College (1965–69) under the German Foundation Alexander von Humboldt. Th.D. of the Theological Faculty of the National University of Athens (1970, Summa cum laude). During his military service (1952–54) he attended the Schools of the Reserve Offices of Syros and of the MB Signals (to both first in rank and chief of School). He studied various religions, including Hinduism, Buddhism, Taoism, Confucianism, African religions, Islam.

Church ministry
Yannoulatos was ordained as a deacon on 7 August 1960; as a priest on 24 May 1964; and as Bishop of Androusa for the position of the General Director of Apostoliki Diakonia of the Church of Greece on 19 November 1972. He was acting archbishop of the Holy Archbishopric of Irinoupolis (Kenya, Uganda, Tanzania) from 1981 through 1991 and the Patriarchal Exarch in Albania from January 1991 through June 1992. He was Metropolitan of Androussa from August 1991 through June 1992 and Archbishop of Tirana, Durrës and Primate of Albania since June 24, 1992. 

After the 2019 Albania earthquake, the primate of the Orthodox Church of Albania received a letter of solidarity from Reverend Olav Fykse Tveit on behalf of the WCC, which affirms that "the poignant images of devastation and destruction grieve us greatly, as do the accounts of families left destitute by this event, especially as winter fast approaches". It concluded with the WCC asking him "to share our message of support and condolence with Christians and with all people of good will in Albania, including religious communities of other faiths with whom you work so closely."

Scientific career
Lehrbeauftragte, for teaching modern-Greek language and philology – University of Marburg, Germany (1966–69). He organized and directed the «Center of Missionary Studies» at the University of Athens (1971–76).  Associate Professor of History of Religions (1972–76).  Full Professor of History of Religions in the National University of Athens (1976–97). Prof. Emeritus (1997 ff.). At the same university: Director of the Department of the Science of Religions and Sociology (1983–86). Dean of the Theological Faculty and member of the Senate (1983–86). Vice-president of the Club of Students. Chairman of the Commission of Solidarity in the Cyprian Struggle (1975–84). Member of the Committee of Research of the University of Athens (1986–1990). and the «Inter-Orthodox Center of Athens» of the Church Greece (1971–75). Member of the Council of the Centre of Mediterranean and Arabic Studies (1978–82).
ThD h.c. of:  The Theological School of the Holy Cross, Brookline, Ma, USA (1989), the Theological Faculty of the Aristotle University of Thessaloniki (1995),  and the St. Vladimir's Orthodox Theological Seminary (2003). Theological School of the Craiova University (2006); Theological Faculty of the Pontifical University of South Italy (2009); Honorary Member of the Moscow Theological Academy (1998). D. Staniloae Diploma Univ. Bucharest (the highest theological distinction of this university) (2003).  
PhD h.c. of:  The Department of History and Archaeology of the Philosophical Faculty of the University of Ioannina (1996); The Agricultural University of Athens (1996); The Department of Political Science and Public Administration of the Law, Economic and Political Sciences and all the Departments of the Philosophical Faculty of the National University of Athens (1998); the Department of International and European Studies of the University of Piraeus (2001); The Department of Philology of the University of Crete (2002); The Departments of Physics, Medicine, Primary Education and Civic Engineers of the University of Patras (2002); Doctor of Humane Letters of Boston University (2004); The Departments of Medical and Agricultural of University of Thesalia, and Golden Medal of this university (2005); the History Department of the Ionian University, Corfou (2007); the University of Korça (2008); of the Departments of History and Ethnology as well as of Languages and Culture of Thrace's Dimokriteian University (2009)); the University of Cyprus (2010).

Church and Social Work
Laypreacher, catechetical work with teenagers; responsible for Bible studies, students camps, missionary efforts in new social frontiers. (1954–60). Founder and director of the Inter-Orthodox Missionary Centre «Porefthendes» (1961 ff.). He organized and directed (1971–74) the Inter-Orthodox Centre of the Church of Greece; during his term of office there dozens of Conferences, Seminars and other Church and social activities were organized. During his post-graduate studies in Germany he ministered to the emigrant Greek workers and students.  He has been: Member of the council: of the High School of Social Work – Deaconesses (1977–84); of the Highest Official Committee of the Church of Greece (1977–85); of the Committee of the Ecclesiastical Education of the Ministry of National Education and Religions (1977–82); of the Commission for the Protection of the Cultural Legacy of Cyprus (1985–91), of the Scholarships Commission of the Foundation Alexander Onassis (1978–94); of the Foundation Alexander Onassis (1994–2005). Member of the Philekpaideutike Society (1994 ff.).

International inter-ecclesiastical activity
General Secretary of the «Executive Committee for the External Mission» (1958–61), and vice-president of the International Organization of Orthodox Youth «Syndesmos» (1964–1977). Member of the «International Commission for Missionary Studies» of the WCC (1963–1969). Secretary for «Missionary Research and the Relations with the Orthodox Churches», in the General Secretariat of the WCC (1969–71). Member of many international scientistic committees, such as: the «Deutsche Gesellschaft für Missionswissenschaft»; the «International Society of Missionary Research»; the Commission of the WCC for the Dialogue with Other Churches and Ideologies (1975–83); the Mixed Commission of the «Conference of European Churches» and the «Conference of Roman Catholic Bishops», «Islam in Europe» (1989–91); the «International Council» of the World Conference on Religion and Peace (1985–94).

From 1959 onwards he has participated in a number of international, inter-Orthodox, inter-Christian and inter-religious conferences, and World Assemblies (several times as main speaker) representing the Church, or the university in international organizations. He has offered lectures to several University centers concerning Christian witness, the inter-religious dialogue, and worldwide solidarity and peace.
 
Honorary member of the Curatorium of the Roman Catholic Institution «Pro Oriente», Vienna (1989 ff.). President-Moderator of the Commission on World Mission and Evangelism of the WCC (1984–1991). Member of the Central Committee of the WCC (1998–2006). Fellow of the Orthodox Academy of Crete (2001).  Corresponding Member of the Academy of Athens (1993–2005). Member of the European Council of Religious Leaders/Religions for Peace (2001 ff.). Vice-president of the Conference of European Churches (2003–2009). President of the World Council of Churches (2006-) (one of the eight presidents). Honorary President of the World Conference of Religions for Peace (2006-).

Honours
The Holy Cross of the Apostle and Evangelist Mark, First Class, of the Patriarchate of Alexandria (1985), of Saint Catherine of the Mount Sinai (1985), of Sts. Cyrill and Methodios of the Orthodox Church of Czeschoslovakia (1986); the Silver Medal of the Academy of Athens «as the promoter and pioneer of missionary theology and action» (1987), and the Golden Medal with Laurel of the Greek Red Cross (1994); the Grand Cross of the Order of Honor of the Hellenic Republic (1997); the Medal of the Great Prince Vladimir (first class) of the Russian Church (1998); the Medal of Apostle Andreas of the Ecumenical Patriarchate (1999);  the Grand Cross of the Order of the Orthodox Crusaders of the Holy Sepulchre (2000); the Life Achievement Prize of the Council of Greeks Abroad (2000).

He was also honored with: the Athenagoras Human Rights Award 2001 (New York); the «Pro Humanitate», of the European Cultural Institution Pro Europe (Freiburg) (2001); the Grand Cross of the Order of Apostle Paul of the Church of Greece (2001); the Golden Medal of Honor and welfare work of the City of Athens (2001); the Golden key of the City of Thessaloniki (2002), and of Lamia (2002); the Polish humanitarian award «Ecce Homo» (2003); the Medal from the President of the Romanian Democracy (2003);  the Golden Medal, first class, of the Municipality of Piraeus (2005); Honorary Citizen of Tirana (2005) and Korça (2007); the Prize «for outstanding activities in strengthening Unity of Orthodox Christian Nations» (Moscow 2006); Medal of Yaroslav the Wiseman of the Ukrainian Democracy (2008); Grand Golden Medal of Apostle Barnabas of the Church of Cyprus (2008); the Grand Cross of the Order of Apostle Marc of the Patriarchate of Alexandria and all Africa (2009).

Publications
The Spirits M’bandwa and the framework of their Cult (1970, in Greek)
The Lord of Brightness». The God of the Tribes East of Kenya. A Research in the History of Religion (in Greek, 1971; 3rd edition 1983)
Various Christian Approaches to the Other Religions (1971)
Islam: A General Survey (in Greek, 1975; 15th edition 2006)
Universality and Orthodoxy (in Greek, 2000; 6th edition 2006), translated into Serbian (2002), Romanian (2003), Albanian (2004), Bulgarian (2005); and English as Facing the World:  Orthodox Christian Essays on Global Concerns (St. Vladimir's Seminary Press, and WCC 2003).  
Footprints of the Quest for the Transcendent (in Greek, 2004; 3rd ed. 2006)
Mission in Christ’s Way (2007, in Greek). 
To the End of the Earth(2009, in Greek).  
In Africa (2010, in Greek). 
Three Catechetical Manuals (1960–1982; in seven reprints 1978–1982)

He has also written more than 240 essays and articles, including: 
“Monks and Mission in the Eastern Church during the Fourth Century” (1966).  
“Les Missions des Eglises d’Orient” (1972).  
“Relations between Man and Nature in the World Religions” (1983)
“Die Mystik in Byzanz” (1983).  
“Der Dialog mit dem Islam aus orthodoxen Sicht” (1986). 
“Orthodoxe Mission. Vergangenheit, Gegenwart, Zukunft” (1999).  
“Orthodoxy Faces the Third Millennium” (2000).  
“The Church of Albania. History and Spiritual Tradition” (2000). 
“Responsabilité apostolique et dimension universelle de l’Eglise” (2001). 
“Problems and Prospects of Inter-religious Dialogue” (2002). 
“God, in your grace transform the world” (2006). 
“Christen in einem multi-religiösen geeinten Europa” (2007). 
“La lumière du Christ et l’Europe” (2008). “Η Ορθόδοξος Αυτοκέφαλος Εκκλησία της Αλβανίας σήμερα” (2009). “Appelés à une seule espérance en Christ” (2009).
Founder and editor of bilingual quarterly Porefthentes (Go-Ye) (1960–1970), of the quarterly review Panta ta Ethne (All Nations) (1981–92). Also in Albanian: the quarterly Kërkim (Search) and the monthly newspaper Ngjallja (Resurrection). From his essays and articles a number have also been published into German, French, Russian, Swedish, Finnish, Serbian, Romanian, Bulgarian, Italian, Spanish and Albanian.
Archbishop Anastasios is considered a pioneer in the rekindling of the missionary endeavour in the Orthodox Churches.  Scholar in the field of History of Religions and inter-religious dialogue. Simultaneously, he has struggled as a peace-maker within the Balkans.

Titles 

The official title of the Archbishop of Tirana, Durrës and All Albania is: His Beatitude, Anastasios, Archbishop of Tirana, Durrës and All Albania;

See also
 Rrok Mirdita
 Orthodox Autocephalous Church of Albania

References

External links 

 Official Site of the Albanian Orthodox Church
 WCC bio
 Jim Forest: The Resurrection of the Church of Albania
 Saint Pachomius Library:  Anastasios (Yannoulatos), Archbishop of Albania

1929 births
Living people
Albanian religious leaders
Albanian people of Greek descent
Christian missionaries in Albania
20th-century Eastern Orthodox archbishops
Greek religious leaders
National and Kapodistrian University of Athens alumni
Academic staff of the National and Kapodistrian University of Athens
Primates of the Albanian Orthodox Church
University of Marburg alumni
Writers from Piraeus
21st-century Eastern Orthodox archbishops
Recipients of the Order of Prince Yaroslav the Wise, 3rd class